Everybody Wants Some may refer to:
"Everybody Wants Some!! (song)", a song from Van Halen's 1980 album Women and Children First
Everybody Wants Some!! (film), 2016
"Everybody Wants Some", a song by Danger Danger from their 1991 album Screw It!
"Everybody Wants Some. Pt. 1", a song from Galactic's 1998 album Coolin' Off
"Everybody Wants Some, Pt. 2"
"Everybody Wants Some, Pt. 3"